Killara  is a suburb on the Upper North Shore of Sydney in the state of New South Wales, Australia  north-west of the Sydney Central Business District in the local government area of Ku-ring-gai Council. East Killara is a separate suburb and West Killara is a locality within Killara.

History 
Killara is an Aboriginal word meaning permanent or always there. The name of the suburb was chosen when the railway line opened in 1899. James George Edwards was a representative of the people who requested a station be built here. The suburb was established as a 'Gentlemen's suburb', designed so that there would be no commercial ventures in the area. For this reason, the suburb has very few shops in the original development.

Killara Post Office opened on 7 November 1904.

Killara later became the home of the famous architect Harry Seidler, whose home—designed by him and his wife Penelope in the 1960s—can still be seen in Kalang Avenue. It is sometimes known as Killara House and sometimes as Harry and Penelope Seidler House. The couple moved into the house on Harry Seidler's birthday in 1967. The garden contains a sculpture by the Los Angeles sculptor Eric Orr. The house is heritage-listed.

Marian Street Theatre played a significant role in the cultural life of the North Shore. The Theatre is temporarily closed for renovation works.

Heritage listings 
Killara has a number of heritage-listed sites, including:
 13 Kalang Avenue: Harry and Penelope Seidler House
 1 Werona Avenue: Woodlands, Killara

Infrastructure and development 
Killara railway station is on the North Shore & Western Line, and T9 Northern Line of the Sydney Trains network. The Pacific Highway is the main road thoroughfare through Killara. Churches in the suburb comprise St Martin's Anglican Church and Killara Uniting Church (formerly Killara Congregational Church) on Karranga Avenue.

The Swain Gardens were donated to Ku-ring-gai Council by Mr Swain, a Sydney bookseller, in the 1920s, and are today maintained by the council and volunteers. The gardens have been listed by the National Trust of Australia.

Schools 
Killara is served by two public primary schools, Killara Public School and Beaumont Road Public School. The suburb is also home to Killara High School, one of the highest performing non-selective government secondary school in New South Wales. A short-lived private school in Killara, Abbotsholme College, counted two future prime ministers among its pupils.

Killara is also home to some child care centres, including Handprints Pre School and Child Care

Clubs
Killara has recreational sport centres like Killara lawn tennis club and Killara golf club, which is ranked the Top 100 golf courses in Australia and picturesque views to the Blue Mountains has attracted Golfers.

Commercial 

Commercial developments are located along the Pacific Highway, including the Greengate Hotel, Beacon lighting, Poolwerx, and Killara hotel. Residents usually travel to nearby suburbs of Gordon, Macquarie Park and Chatswood for regular shopping.

Residential 
The majority of residential properties are built in the Federation and Californian Bungalow styles, although the suburb includes many other styles.

The Harry and Penelope Seidler House at 13 Kalang Avenue was designed by Harry and Penelope Seidler. The 1960s-era modern-design home, constructed with reinforced masonry walls, concrete floors and roof, rubble-stone retaining walls and fireplace, won the Wilkinson Award in 1967.

At the 2016 census, 57.5% of occupied private dwellings were separate houses and 40.5% were flat or apartments.  The average household size was 2.9 people.

Politics 
For federal elections, Killara lies in the electorate of Bradfield, currently represented by Paul Fletcher. For state elections, Killara falls under the state electoral districts of Davidson and Ku-ring-gai. Kuring-gai is represented by Alister Henskens. The member for Davidson is Jonathan O'Dea. In terms of local government, Killara is part of the Ku-ring-gai municipal council.

Population and demographics 

In the 2016 Australian census, the total population of Killara was 10,574 people; 47.5 percent were male and 52.5 percent were female.  53.7% of people were born in Australia. The most common countries of birth were China 11.5%, England 4.7%, Hong Kong 3.9%, South Korea 2.7% and New Zealand 1.8%. 61.1% of people only spoke English at home. Other languages spoken at home included Mandarin 13.9%, Cantonese 7.6%, Korean 3.2% and Japanese 1.0%. The most common responses for religion were No Religion 35.5%, Catholic 17.7% and Anglican 15.8%, Of persons aged 15 years and over, 59.1% were married, 28.2% never married, 5.8% widowed 5.2% divorced, and 1.6% separated.

The median weekly personal income was A$951, compared with A$662 in Australia. The median weekly household income was A$2,534, compared with A$1,438 in Australia. The median weekly family income was A$2,918, compared with A$1,734 in Australia.

Notable residents 
 John Alexander OAM MP- Tennis champion and former Federal Member for Bennelong
 Carlyle Greenwell – Architect, philanthropist and designer of Killara Uniting Church and many, now heritage listed, houses.
 Peter Jackson – boxer, British Commonwealth and Heavyweight champion.
 David Koch, an Australian financial analyst, television presenter and host of Sunrise on the Seven Network.
 Elle Macpherson, – grew up in Killara and also attended the local high school, Killara High School.
 Charles Scrivener – surveyor
 Penelope Seidler – architect
 Ethel Turner –  author of Seven Little Australians lived on a large property now known as Kiamala Crescent.
 Jim Waley – a former presenter and newsreader for National Nine News.
 Robert Alan Crook - Electrical Engineer, owner of Alan Crook Electrical manufacturers, partner in Acelec and founder of Australian Rostrum

References

External links 

  [CC-By-SA]
 

Suburbs of Sydney
1821 establishments in Australia
 
Populated places established in 1821
Lane Cove River